R.E.V.O. is the third studio album and debut major-label album by Canadian indie band Walk off the Earth. It was released on March 19, 2013 through Columbia Records. It contains 9 original songs, along with a cover of Gotye's "Somebody That I Used to Know" and Staylefish's "No Ulterior Motives".

R.E.V.O. is an acronym for the band's motto, Realize Every Victory Outright.

Track listing

Commercial performance
The album debuted at No. 7 on Top Canadian Albums.  In the United States, the album debuted at No. 90 on Billboard 200, and No. 29 on Top Rock Albums, selling 5,000 copies in its first week.  It has sold 51,000 copies in the US as of May 2015.

Personnel
Per liner notes
Walk off the Earth
Ryan Marshall
Joel Cassady
Mike Taylor
Sarah Blackwood
Gianni Luminati

Production
Produced by Thomas "Tawgs" Salter, Gianni "Luminati" Nicassio, and Walk off the Earth
Mixed by Lenny DeRose, Howie Beck, and Justin Koop
Recorded by Gianni Luminati, Tawgs Salter, and Justin Koop
Mastered by Vlado Meller; assisted by Mark Santangelo
A&R by Mark Williams

Charts and certifications

Charts

Certifications

References

External links
 R.E.V.O. at Walk off the Earth official site

2013 albums
Walk Off the Earth albums
Columbia Records albums